The southern pale-hipped skink (Celatiscincus euryotis) is a species of lizard in the family Scincidae. It is endemic to Isle of Pines, New Caledonia.

References

External links
 

Celatiscincus
Skinks of New Caledonia
Endemic fauna of New Caledonia
Reptiles described in 1910
Taxa named by Franz Werner